Saints Peter and Paul Italian Catholic Church and Rectory is a historic church building on Columbus Avenue at East Jefferson Street in Sandusky, Ohio. It is home to a parish of the Roman Catholic Diocese of Toledo. The current Pastor of Sts. Peter & Paul is Fr. Monte Hoyles. The Associate Pastor's are Fr. Zach Brown and Fr. Jacob George. Sts. Peter & Paul has three Deacons; Deacon Phil Dinovo, Deacon Jeff Claar, and Deacon Bill Burch.

History
It was built in 1866 and added to the National Register in 1983. The Church was built by local Italian-Americans who immigrated to this country in the mid to late 1800's. Many Italianate features that can be detected in this church, are the many statues, the Stations of the Cross which were built in Italy, the Altar which is made of marble from Italy, and the intricate stain glass windows on the sides of the church, as well as the five behind the altar depicting, from L-R, St. Peter, The Last Supper, The Risen Christ, The Crucifixion, and St. Paul.  University of Notre Dame football coach, Knute Rockne, was married in this church in 1914.

Patrons
Sts. Peter & Paul Italian Catholic Church celebrates their parish feast day on June 29, the Solemnity of Sts. Peter and Paul. These two leading saints are considered the founders of the See of Rome, through their preaching, ministry, and martyrdom there. There are two stain glass windows behind the sanctuary in the center apse featuring St. Peter & St. Paul. Also, you may find two statues in the South apse near the Holy Face Of Jesus, of St. Peter & St. Paul.

Organ
The Organ at Sts. Peter & Paul Italian Catholic Church is a 1981 Shantz Pipe Organ. It was installed in 1981. It has 1,591 pipes with 27 ranks. It has an electro-pneumatic chest with 4 divisions, 3 manuals, 21 stops, and 38 registers. It is in good condition and is used at all masses. This organ is state of the art. The organ is prominently featured in the center apse, behind the sanctuary.

Liturgy
Music:
Sts. Peter & Paul has a Pipe Organ and a Baby Grand Piano near the Sanctuary. There is an adult choir (with around 12 members) who sing at the 10:00 AM Sunday mass accompanied by a guitarist and occasionally a violinist.

Liturgy:
There are various volunteer liturgies at Sts. Peter & Paul, these include; Mass Coordinators, Ushers/Greeters, Communion Distributors, Servers, and Lectors.

Committees
Sts. Peter & Paul Italian Catholic Church has numerous advisory boards that advise the Pastor on day-to-day operation of the parish. These committees include; Pastoral Council, Finance Committee, Buildings & Grounds Committee, and Arts & Environment Committee.

Diocese Of Toledo 
Sts. Peter & Paul Italian Catholic Church is located in the Roman Catholic Diocese of Toledo. The Diocese is shepherded by The Most Holy Rev. Bishop Daniel E. Thomas. He has served as bishop since 2014. The Diocese of Toledo covers the Northwestern parts of the State of Ohio. Our Lady, Queen of the Most Holy Rosary Cathedral is the mother church of the diocese. The Diocese contains about 319,907 Catholics in an area population of 1,465,561.

Sandusky Central Catholic School 
Our youth and their formation in the Catholic faith are central to our mission at the Catholic Parishes of Sandusky. To help in handing down our values and classical education, Sts. Peter and Paul parish financially and spiritually supports Sandusky Central Catholic School along with two other local parishes. Students at SCCS begin education in the arts and music in Kindergarten and our strong academic approach establishes the foundation for life-long learning and discovery.  Throughout their learning journey, students are prepared and challenged for their high school career and beyond with an emphasis on values and leadership. Sandusky Central Catholic School has an open enrollment policy, and students in preschool thorough grade twelve are eligible to apply for admission at any time.

Sts. Peter & Paul Parish Festival 
Sts. Peter & Paul formerly held a parish festival every year on the feast day of St. Peter & St. Paul. It was held in the Sts. Peter & Paul School parking lot. Spaghetti dinners were served inside the school in the cafeteria. Games, fellowship, food, and faith were all a part of the Sts. Peter & Paul Parish Festival. The festival was permanently cancelled in the late 2000's due to lack of involvement and interest.

References

Roman Catholic churches completed in 1865
Churches on the National Register of Historic Places in Ohio
Gothic Revival church buildings in Ohio
Italianate architecture in Ohio
Churches in Erie County, Ohio
National Register of Historic Places in Erie County, Ohio
Roman Catholic churches in Sandusky, Ohio
19th-century Roman Catholic church buildings in the United States
Italianate church buildings in the United States